Bloomingburg, previously Bloomingburgh, is a village in the Sullivan County town of Mamakating, New York, United States.  The population was 1,032 at the 2020 census.

History 
Bloomingburg's accepted incorporation date is 1833. It was the first county seat of Sullivan County, being located in the original county town of Mamakating. It prospered, first, as a center of commerce along the Newburgh–Cochecton Turnpike, then as a railway town serving vacationers in the mountains. Many guesthouses in the village were not rebuilt after the devastating fire of February 1922, and the village has been primarily an agricultural center ever since.

The Bloomingburg Reformed Protestant Dutch Church was listed on the National Register of Historic Places in 1980.

Geography
Bloomingburg is located at  (41.556159, −74.441060). The village's eastern boundary is the Shawangunk Kill, Dutch for "Shawangunk River", also the Orange County line at that point, with its western boundary a short distance up the Shawangunk Ridge. It is the only population center in Sullivan County entirely within the Hudson River watershed.

The northern and southern boundaries roughly parallel Main Street, also County Route 171, the former route of NY 17, which now bypasses the village to the north as an expressway. It is served by two exits on Route 17, one for Burlingham Road and the other, just over the county line, for NY 17K.

Demographics

As of the 2010 census Bloomingburg had a population of 420. 77.9% of the population was non-Hispanic whites, 4.5% non-Hispanic African American, 0.5% Native American, 1.0% Asian, 5.7% reporting two or more races and 13.3% Hispanic or Latino.

As of the census of 2000, there were 353 people, 146 households, and 94 families residing in the village. The population density was 1,113.7 people per square mile (425.9/km2). There were 181 housing units at an average density of 571.0 per square mile (218.4/km2). The racial makeup of the village was 92.92% white, 2.83% African American, 1.98% Asian, 0.57% from other races, and 1.70% from two or more races. Hispanic or Latino of any race were 7.93% of the population.

There were 146 households, out of which 35.6% had children under the age of 18 living with them, 50.0% were married couples living together, 11.6% had a female householder with no husband present, and 35.6% were non-families. 29.5% of all households were made up of individuals, and 10.3% had someone living alone who was 65 years of age or older. The average household size was 2.42 and the average family size was 3.04.

In the village, the population was spread out, with 27.8% under the age of 18, 9.3% from 18 to 24, 34.8% from 25 to 44, 16.1% from 45 to 64, and 11.9% who were 65 years of age or older. The median age was 32 years. For every 100 females, there were 90.8 males. For every 100 females age 18 and over, there were 90.3 males.

The median income for a household in the village was $38,571, and the median income for a family was $41,111. Males had a median income of $35,938 versus $21,750 for females. The per capita income for the village was $21,441. About 17.0% of families and 11.1% of the population were below the poverty line, including 17.7% of those under age 18 and 8.7% of those age 65 or over.

Notable persons
 Edward M. Hunter, Wisconsin state senator and lawyer, was born in Bloomingburg.

References

External links
 Official site

Villages in New York (state)
Villages in Sullivan County, New York